Wayllani (Aymara waylla Stipa obtusa, a kind of feather grass, -ni a suffix, "the one with the feather grass", also spelled Huayllani) is a  mountain in the Andes in Bolivia. It is located in the Oruro Department, Cercado Province, Paria Municipality (formerly Soracachi). Wayllani lies east of Jach'a Ch'ankha and southeast of Chunkara.

References 

Mountains of Oruro Department